Delio Lake is a lake in the Province of Varese, Lombardy, Italy. It serves as the upper reservoir for the pumped-storage Roncovalgrande Hydroelectric Plant.

Lakes of Lombardy